Bahman Karaj Football Club (Behmin Kârej) was an Iranian football club based in Karaj, Iran. In 1993, the rights and licenses of two football clubs Vahdat F.C. and Bank Sepah F.C. were purchased and Bahman F.C. entered the league. In the early years, the bulk of players were from Pas Tehran F.C.'s winning squads of 1991 and 1992.

History
Bahman was founded in 1994 and operated until the end of the 1999–2000 Azadegan League season, after which their shares were bought by now Iran Pro League side Paykan.

Continental history

Honours

Domestic
Hazfi Cup:
Winners (1):1993–94

Runners-Up (2):1996–97,1999–00

Azadegan League:
Runners-Up (2): 1995–96, 1996–97

Invitational
 DCM Trophy
 Winners (1): 1994–95

Managers
Firouz Karimi (1994–1995)
Farhad Kazemi (1995–2000)

References

Defunct football clubs in Iran
Association football clubs established in 1994
Association football clubs disestablished in 2000
Sport in Tehran
1994 establishments in Iran
2000 disestablishments in Iran